William Leonard Gammage  (born 1942) is an Australian academic historian, adjunct professor and senior research fellow at the Humanities Research Centre of the Australian National University (ANU).
Gammage was born in Orange, New South Wales, went to Wagga Wagga High School and then to ANU. He was on the faculty of the University of Papua New Guinea and the University of Adelaide. He is a fellow of the Australian Academy of Social Sciences and deputy chair of the National Museum of Australia.

History studies

World War I
Gammage is best known for his book The Broken Years: Australian Soldiers in the Great War, which is based on his PhD thesis written while at the Australian National University. It was first published in 1974, and re-printed in 1975, 1980, 1981 (the year in which Peter Weir's film, Gallipoli came out), 1985 and 1990. The study revives the tradition of C. E. W. Bean, Australia's official historian of World War I, who focused his narrative on the men in the line rather than the strategies of generals. Gammage corresponded with 272 Great War veterans, and consulted the personal records of another 728, mostly at the Australian War Memorial.

Gammage has written several other books about the experiences of soldiers in World War I, including three definitive books about Australian soldiers in the war. He also co-edited the Australians 1938 volume of the Bicentennial History of Australia (1988).

Aboriginal peoples' planning and management of Australia
In 1998, Gammage joined the Humanities Research Centre at the ANU as a senior research fellow for the Australian Research Council, working on the history of Aboriginal land management. His scope was cross-disciplinary, working "across fields as disparate as history, anthropology and botany".

In the subsequent 13-year period Gammage researched and wrote the book The Biggest Estate on Earth: How Aborigines made Australia, released in October 2011. It won the 2012 Prime Minister's Prize for Australian History in the Prime Minister's Literary Awards, the 2011 Manning Clark House National Cultural Awards in the individual category, was shortlisted for the 2012 Kay Daniels Award, the History Book Award of the 2012 Queensland Literary Awards and awarded the 2012 Victorian Premier's Literary Awards overall Victorian Prize for Literature on top of the non-fiction category prize.

Gallipoli
As a historical adviser, Gammage has worked on many documentaries and his writing is cited as an authoritative source on Australia's participation in World War I. For the film Gallipoli directed by Peter Weir, Gammage was employed as the military advisor and he worked on the text that David Williamson turned into the screen play of the film.

Local history of Narrandera
Gammage produced a historical study of the Shire of Narrandera. Gammage was made a freeman of Narrandera Shire Council in 1987.

Adelaide ANZAC Day commentary
Gammage was part of the Australian Broadcasting Commission Adelaide ANZAC Day Commemorative March commentary team until 2015.

Awards and nominations
 1988 – ABC/ABA Manning Clark Bicentennial History Award, for his book Narrandera Shire
 1999 – Queensland Premier's Literary Awards, History Book Award for The Sky Travellers: Journeys in New Guinea 1938–39
 1999 – shortlisted in the New South Wales Premier's History Awards for The Sky Travellers: Journeys in New Guinea 1938–39
 2005 – Member of the Order of Australia (AM)
 2010 – presented the inaugural Eric Rolls Memorial Lecture
 2011 – Manning Clark House National Cultural Award winner for The Biggest Estate on Earth
 2012 – Prime Minister's Literary Awards, Prize for Australian History for The Biggest Estate on Earth
 2012 – shortlisted for the Kay Daniels Award
 2012 – Queensland Literary Awards, History Book Award
 2012 – Victorian Premier's Literary Awards overall Victorian Prize for Literature on top of the non-fiction category prize
 2012 – ACT Book of the Year

Influence
Bruce Pascoe has acknowledged the work done by Gammage (and also Rupert Gerritsen), which especially influenced his 2014 award-winning book describing early Aboriginal settlements and agriculture, Dark Emu: Black Seeds: Agriculture or Accident?.

Publications

Books

Journal articles
 

 

 

 

 

 (1991) ANZAC's influence on Turkey and Australia.  Journal of the Australian War Memorial 18; Presented as a keynote address at the 1990 Australian War Memorial history conference

Book chapters
 – "Oral and Written Sources." In Oral Tradition in Melanesia. Ed. by Donald Denoon, Roderic Lacey. Port Moresby, New Guinea: University of Papua, New Guinea and Institute of Papua New Guinea Studies. pp. 115–24.

Other work
 "Sir John Monash : a military review" (Melbourne University, 1974)
 "The story of Gallipoli" / text by Bill Gammage ; screenplay by David Williamson ; preface by Peter Weir. Ringwood, Vic. : Penguin Australia 1981) Released August 1981 as "Gallipoli.", dir. by Peter Weir

Notes

External links
Australia in World War One, by Dr Peter Stanley
The Sports Factor interview with Bill Gammage on ABC Radio

1942 births
Australian historians
Australian National University alumni
Academic staff of the Australian National University
Fellows of the Academy of the Social Sciences in Australia
Living people
Members of the Order of Australia
People from New South Wales
Academic staff of the University of Adelaide
Academic staff of the University of Papua New Guinea